Jen Mueller (born June 28, 1978) is an American television and radio sports broadcast journalist, sports official, business consultant, and author. She is known for appearing on Seattle Mariners television broadcasts for the Root Sports Northwest network, while also appearing as the radio sideline reporter for the Seattle Seahawks football team. When she was a college freshman, she began serving as a flag football official, later becoming the third woman in history to earn All-American honors. She is the founder of Talk Sporty to Me, which is a professional development organization that introduces the value of sports conversations in the corporate environment, while focusing on the correlation between successful strategic planning and "leveling the playing field" in business relationships.

Personal background 
Jennifer Mueller was born on June 28, 1978 and grew up in Houston, Texas. She attended the Southern Methodist University in Dallas, graduating in 2000 with degrees in broadcast journalism and public policy. While she was a college freshman, she began serving as a flag football official. After three years, she earned All-American honors as an official, becoming the third female in the history of the award to be recognized. Following her graduation from college, she began officiating high school sports.

Professional background

Broadcast journalism 
Mueller began her broadcasting career producing Texas Cable News in Dallas, later relocating to Seattle and joining the staff at Northwest Cable News and KING-TV. In fall 2006, she began working as the sideline reporter for Big Sky Conference football with Fox Sports Northwest, later known as Root Sports Northwest.

Seattle Seahawks
In 2009, she joined the Seattle Seahawks football broadcast team, where she works alongside Steve Raible and Warren Moon. She was the first person to interview Seahawks receiver Golden Tate, following his controversial touchdown catch against the Green Bay Packers, during the Seahawks Monday Night Football win on September 25, 2012.

Seattle Mariners
She is a member of the Seattle Mariners broadcast team, where she delivers game reports, while conducting "walk-off" interviews for Mariners All-Access, a weekly magazine-style television program broadcast on Root Sports Northwest. She was the first person to interview Félix Hernández, following his perfect game on August 15, 2012.

Business consulting 
In 2009, Mueller established Talk Sporty to Me, which is a professional development organization that introduces the value of sports conversations in the corporate environment, while focusing on the correlation between successful strategic planning and "leveling the playing field" in business relationships. She shows business professionals how to leverage sports conversations and provides tools to raise their personal and professional profile. She is also an annual "NFL Combine Football Career Conference" speaker for the online sports-career training school Sports Management Worldwide, founded and run by Dr. Lynn Lashbrook.

Published works 
In 2013, Mueller released the book GameTime: Learn to Talk Sports in 5 Minutes a Day for Business which is a resource for new and novice sports fans. She presents the value of incorporating sports conversations in business, while providing dialogue examples of how to build relationships using her proprietary techniques.

References

External links 
 

Living people
American television sports anchors
American television producers
American women television producers
American radio sports announcers
Southern Methodist University alumni
Television anchors from Seattle
Seattle Seahawks announcers
College football announcers
College basketball announcers in the United States
National Football League announcers
Major League Baseball broadcasters
Seattle Mariners announcers
1978 births
American women television journalists
21st-century American women